Ioannis Tsintsaris (8 February 1962 – 1 March 2017) was a Greek weightlifter who competed at the 1984 Summer Olympics. He was married to javelin thrower Anna Verouli from 1984 to 1988. In 1993, he retired from his Olympic career, and in 1996, he became a weightlifting coach in Sidirokastro up until 2008.

References

External links

1962 births
2017 deaths
Greek male weightlifters
Weightlifters at the 1984 Summer Olympics
Olympic weightlifters of Greece
People from Sidirokastro
Sportspeople from Central Macedonia